Björns trädgård is a park on Södermalm in Stockholm, Sweden.  The park is located by the major street Götgatan, opposite Medborgarplatsen.

History
The park is a green place for the citizens of Stockholm, and contain a playground for children.
The park was named after the  former owner Swedish doctor Karl Fredrik Björn  (1855-1915). In 1925, the City of Stockholm began the construction work for a children's playground. In 1929, the renovation of the park's older lots was initiated, and in 1933–1935, terrace lots and retaining walls were added, as well as a splashing pond at the western end of the ore farm.
The park was given a major facelift in 2004 and now contains a skateboard ramp. The Stockholm Mosque is located on a hill by the park.
In the park is the sculpture "Grodan" which was cast in bronze in 1943 by Per Hasselberg (1850 – 1894).

References

Parks in Stockholm